The 2014–15 Basketball Championship of Bosnia and Herzegovina was the 14th season of this championship, with 12 teams from Bosnia participating in it.

Current season teams (2014-2015)

Regular season

Results

Liga 6

Results

Playoffs

Finals

External links
Official website

Basketball Championship of Bosnia and Herzegovina
Bosnia
Basketball